The Anderson case took place in Canada West from 1860 to 1861. The case dealt with whether or not to extradite an escaped slave to the United States on the charge of murder. The majority of the presiding judges who handled the case agreed that there was sufficient evidence to prove criminality of the extraditable offence. The decision was based upon the terms laid out in Article X of the Webster–Ashburton Treaty of 1842. Anderson was released on a technicality.

Background
Jack Burrows, an enslaved man in Missouri, escaped from slavery in September 1853. On 28 September, three days after he left his enslavers, he encountered Seneca T. P. Digges, a slaveowner who sent his slaves to recapture Burrows. During a struggle, Burrows stabbed Digges, who died on 11 October. Accounts differ on whether Digges provoked Burrows.

Burrows, tracked by bounty hunters, travelled by foot to Chicago. From there he went to Detroit and entered Canada, reaching Windsor (then in Canada West) in November 1853. While in Canada, Burrows changed his name to John Anderson. Anderson lived and worked in Canada West from 1854 to April 1860, managing to keep a low profile. A slave catcher from Detroit named James H. Gunning investigated Anderson's case and eventually got a warrant around April or May 1860. Anderson was arrested in August and held by Magistrate William Matthews in Brantford. 

Article X of the Webster–Ashburton Treaty allowed extradition from British North America to the United States if the act for which the US sought extradition would constitute a crime in the relevant British jurisdiction (in this case Canada West). The central issue in Anderson's extradition case was whether his stabbing of Digges was a crime or simply an incident of his escape from slavery.

Legal and political significance

Some have argued that the Anderson case, aside from igniting a media, legal, and political frenzy, had a profound impact on Canada’s future relationship with Britain. It also set an important precedent for Canadian leaders to make the superior courts handle the most political divisive decisions, which had originally been reserved for the executive branch of government.

Assistance
Anti-slavery associations from Britain and pre-Confederation Canada played an instrumental role in assisting Anderson before, during, and after the case. John A. Macdonald used public funds to foot the bill for Anderson's legal defences.

Britain attempts to intervene
A notable event occurred while Anderson was awaiting an appeal of the Canadian court's initial decision, which stipulated that he should indeed be extradited. The English Court of Queen's Bench attempted to interfere by sending a writ of habeas corpus for him to appear before a court in London, England. To Britain's Canadian subjects who were already in the process of handling the situation, "Not only was the writ 'an evil precedent', but it could lead to further conflict between English and Canadian judicatures." The English courts never got their chance to handle the case because Anderson's appeal was expedited to the Court of Common Pleas. He was released due to faulty wording in the warrant.

Reactions
The issue with the British writ and the negative reaction to it uncovered the need for written clarification of the relationship between British and Canadian courts. As one result, the Habeas Corpus Act 1862 was passed by the Parliament of the United Kingdom in 1862, which denied British courts the right to issue writs of habeas corpus for British colonies or dominions with their own courts capable of doing so. It reaffirmed that Canadian jurisdictions had become self-sufficient and did not take kindly to interference in their judicial system.

References

Works cited

Further reading 
 

Law of Canada
Canadian extradition case law
1861 in Canadian case law
Slavery legislation